Matt Lori is a Republican politician from Michigan who formerly served in the Michigan House of Representatives.

A graduate of the FBI National Academy, Lori was the sheriff of St. Joseph County for 20 years before his election to the House.

References

1956 births
Living people
Republican Party members of the Michigan House of Representatives
Michigan sheriffs
People from Sturgis, Michigan
Western Michigan University alumni
People from Constantine, Michigan
20th-century American politicians
21st-century American politicians